The 2020–21 Premier 15s is the 4th season of the Premier 15s (22nd including editions of the previous Women's Premiership), of the top flight of English domestic women's rugby union competition and the first to be sponsored by Allianz.

Teams

Rule Changes
To reduce covid infection risk and close contact, several laws were introduced to reduce the number of scrums. These variations were reviewed after nine rounds and subsequently remained in place until the end of the season. These were:
Free kicks are awarded in place of a scrum for a knock-on or forward pass
Removal of the option for a scrum at a free kick or penalty
Scrums advantages were shortened
In a maul, the ball must be played at the first time of asking if the maul halts
A maul can only be formed from a lineout if it takes place within the 22 metre areas
No players who were not in the lineout may join the maul
Game time is reduced to 35 minutes per half
Water breaks at the mid points of each half (players had to remain distanced)

Table
.

Fixtures
Fixtures for the season were announced by the Premier 15s on 6 October 2020.

Regular season

Round 1

Round 2

Round 3

Round 4

Round 5

Round 6

Round 7

Round 8

Round 9

Round 10

Round 11

Round 12

Round 13

Round 14

Round 15

Round 16

Round 17

Round 18

Playoffs

Semi-finals

Final

Leading scorers

Most points

Most tries

Note

References

External links
 

Premier 15s